Aechmea racinae, or Christmas jewels, is a species of flowering plant in the genus Aechmea, of the family Bromeliaceae. This species is endemic to the State of Espírito Santo in eastern Brazil. A. racinae grows best in partial sun and does not tolerate freezing temperatures.

Aechmea racinae is an epiphytic evergreen perennial, forming basal rosettes of strap-shaped leaves, with arching racemes of tubular red and yellow flowers that give way to berries. In temperate regions it is often grown as a houseplant. It has gained the Royal Horticultural Society's Award of Garden Merit.

Varieties
Three varieties are accepted:

Aechmea racinae var. erecta L.B.Sm.
Aechmea racinae var. racinae 
Aechmea racinae var. tubiformis E.Pereira

Cultivars
Numerous cultivars have been named, including

 Aechmea 'Avarua'
 Aechmea 'Black Jack'
 Aechmea 'Candy Stripe'
 Aechmea 'Exotica'
 Aechmea 'Foster's Favorite'
 Aechmea 'Foster's Favorite Favorite'
 Aechmea 'Harlekin'
 Aechmea 'Red Ribbon'

References

racinae
Flora of Brazil
Plants described in 1941